Catoptria confusellus is a species of moth in the family Crambidae described by Otto Staudinger in 1882. It is found in Austria, the Czech Republic, Slovakia, Hungary, Romania, Bulgaria, Serbia and Montenegro, Albania, the Republic of Macedonia, Greece, Asia Minor and Syria.

References

Crambini
Moths of Europe
Moths of Asia
Moths described in 1882